The Jalan Templer Komuter station is a commuter train station located in Petaling Jaya, Selangor. It is served by the KTM Komuter's Port Klang Line.

Jalan Templer is one of the busiest major roads in Petaling Jaya, Selangor. It was the first road built in Petaling Jaya and was simply called "Jalan 1" or Road 1. The road was named after the former British High Commissioner in Malaya, Sir Gerald Templer.
The station named after the road and was built to cater the traffic in this area and its surroundings.

The Jalan Templer station usually busy during rush hours as it is used by worker to reach offices. It is also used by school children as many schools and colleges are situated in this area. The Kolej Kemahiran Tinggi MARA and Bangunan Peladang are within walking distance to this station. However, at other time, the station is quite deserted. It is advisable to pre-book a taxi before arrival.

Nearest residential properties to this station are Inai Court Apartment and landed houses in Section 1, Section 1A & Section 18.

Name
In the 1980s this station was known as Petaling Jaya Station, before assuming its current name.

References

External links
 Jalan Templer KTM Komuter Station

Railway stations in Selangor
Rapid transit stations in Selangor
Port Klang Line